Pemberton is a city in Blue Earth County, Minnesota, United States. The population was 229 at the 2020 census. It is part of the Mankato-North Mankato Metropolitan Statistical Area.

History
The area of Pemberton had businesses as early as 1894. While many of these building burned prior to the Alphabet Railroad coming through, land was platted in 1907 for the town with the plans for a depot. The town is named for one of the railroad officials.

Geography

Demographics

2010 census
As of the census of 2010, there were 247 people, 91 households, and 68 families living in the city. The racial makeup of the city was 98.0% White, 0.4% Asian, 1.2% from other races, and 0.4% from two or more races. Hispanic or Latino of any race were 3.2% of the population.

There were 91 households, of which 37.4% had children under the age of 18 living with them, 57.1% were married couples living together, 14.3% had a female householder with no husband present, 3.3% had a male householder with no wife present, and 25.3% were non-families. 19.8% of all households were made up of individuals, and 4.4% had someone living alone who was 65 years of age or older. The average household size was 2.71 and the average family size was 3.10.

The median age in the city was 33.4 years. 30.8% of residents were under the age of 18; 6.1% were between the ages of 18 and 24; 32% were from 25 to 44; 21.9% were from 45 to 64; and 9.3% were 65 years of age or older. The gender makeup of the city was 47.4% male and 52.6% female.

2000 census
As of the census of 2000, there were 246 people, 84 households, and 64 families living in the city. The racial makeup of the city was 99.19% White, and 0.81% from two or more races.

There were 84 households, out of which 41.7% had children under the age of 18 living with them, 64.3% were married couples living together, 8.3% had a female householder with no husband present, and 23.8% were non-families. 19.0% of all households were made up of individuals, and 7.1% had someone living alone who was 65 years of age or older.  The average household size was 2.93 and the average family size was 3.44.

In the city, the population was spread out, with 29.7% under the age of 18, 12.6% from 18 to 24, 30.1% from 25 to 44, 19.9% from 45 to 64, and 7.7% who were 65 years of age or older.  The median age was 31 years. For every 100 females, there were 103.3 males.  For every 100 females age 18 and over, there were 98.9 males.

The median income for a household in the city was $39,167, and the median income for a family was $42,222. Males had a median income of $25,714 versus $22,361 for females. The per capita income for the city was $17,640.  None of the families and 4.1% of the population were living below the poverty line, including no under eighteens and 21.1% of those over 64.

References

Cities in Blue Earth County, Minnesota
Cities in Minnesota
Mankato – North Mankato metropolitan area